In Manx tradition, fairies were called Adhene and known as , which means the Children of Pride/Ambition, because they were regarded as having been fallen angels cast from heaven but too good for hell. They could be benevolent but were mostly mischievous in association with humans, taking babies or wives when they wished, although it was believed that their powers were not effective over any human on an errand of mercy.

About the size of a small child when visible, they fished at sea and herded their cattle on the hills. The Manx people knew there would be good fishing or harvests when they heard the fairies making storage barrels in the caves.

See also 

 Arkan Sonney
 Buggane
 Fairy
 Fenodyree
 Glashtyn
 Jimmy Squarefoot
 Moddey Dhoo
 Mooinjer veggey
 Sleih beggey

Sources 

Fairies
Fantasy creatures
Manx legendary creatures
Tuatha Dé Danann